Maureen Baynton (born Maureen Barrett in 1937) is an English former snooker and billiards player. She held the record for winning most Women's Amateur Snooker Championships after winning eight times between 1954 and 1968, and also won seven Women's Amateur Billiards championships between 1955 and 1980. She was runner-up in the 1983 World Women's Snooker Championship.

Biography
Baynton began to play snooker and billiards at Peckham Health Centre, teaching herself, from the age of 11. Three years after taking up the games, she was the girls champion at both snooker and billiards.

After a highly successful playing career in which she won a record eight Women's Amateur Snooker Championships between 1954 and 1968, and seven Women's Amateur Billiards championships between 1955 and 1980, she retired from competition for several years. When the World Women's Snooker Championship was staged in 1976, Baynton entered, reaching the semi-final, where she lost to Muriel Hazeldine. In the 1983 tournament she went one stage further, reaching the final, where she lost 5–8 to Sue Foster.

Throughout her career, she used the cue that she received, aged 10, for winning the Schoolgirls Championship in 1947. It is now on display at the Billiards and Snooker Heritage Collection in Liverpool.

Titles and achievements

Snooker

Billiards

References

External links
Maureen Baynton's cue at the Billiards and Snooker Heritage Collection
Maureen Baynton with her daughter, Wendy.

1937 births
Female snooker players
Female players of English billiards
English snooker players
English players of English billiards
Living people